I'm Not Ready for Christmas is a 2015 American Christmas-themed made-for-television romantic drama film directed by Sam Irvin and starring Alicia Witt, George Stults, Brigid Brannagh, and Dan Lauria. Written by Hanz Wasserburger. The film premiered on the Hallmark Channel on November 14, 2015.

Plot summary

Holly Nolan (Alicia Witt) a driven advertising executive, has her life turned upside down when she discovers that she can no longer lie. Holly is an aunt to 10 year old Anna who missed a very important Christmas recital where Anna was patiently waiting for her arrival. During the recital Anna sings a solo of  We Wish You a Merry Christmas. Holly lied to Anna about why she could not make the recital. This resulted in  Anna (Mia Bagley) making a wish to Santa Claus (Dan Lauria)   Holly's career and love life become complicated when her lies begin to catch up with her, forcing her to judge between truth and what is right.

Cast 
 Alicia Witt as Holly Nolan
 George Stults as Drew Vincent
 Brigid Brannagh as Rose Geller
 Dan Lauria as Santa
 Maxwell Caulfield as Greydon DuPois 
 Mia Bagley as Anna Gellar
 Eli Baldwin as Damon Brouhard
 Derrick Dean as Team Member #2
 Terance Goodman as Man
 Chiao-ih Hui as Team Member #3
 Malinda Money	as Team Member #1
 Zack Phifer as Ted Angle
 Walter Platz as Berkeley O'Connell
Ashley Santos as Jordan Jones
 Palmer Scott as James Brouhard
 Joseph Skousen as Valet

See also
 List of Christmas films
 Liar Liar, 1997 film

References

External links 
 
 
 

2015 television films
2015 films
2015 romantic drama films
2010s Christmas films
2010s Christmas drama films
American romantic drama films
American Christmas drama films
Hallmark Channel original films
Christmas television films
Films directed by Sam Irvin
American drama television films
2010s American films